A Branded Soul is a lost 1917 American silent drama film directed by Bertram Bracken and starring Gladys Brockwell. It was produced and distributed by the Fox Film Corporation.

Cast
Gladys Brockwell as Conchita Cordova
Colin Chase as Juan Mendoza
Vivian Rich as Dona Sartoris
Willard Louis as Pedro
Lew Cody as John Rannie (credited as Lewis J. Cody)
Gloria Payton as Dolores Mendoza
Fred Whitman as Neil Mathews
Barney Furey as Adolf Wylie

References

External links

1917 films
Lost American films
Fox Film films
American silent feature films
American black-and-white films
1917 drama films
Films directed by Bertram Bracken
1910s American films